The 1924 Victorian state election was held on 26 June 1924.

Retiring Members

Labor
Alexander Rogers MLA (Melbourne)

Nationalist
David Smith MLA (Bendigo West)

Legislative Assembly
Sitting members are shown in bold text. Successful candidates are highlighted in the relevant colour. Where there is possible confusion, an asterisk (*) is also used.

See also
1925 Victorian Legislative Council election

References

Psephos - Adam Carr's Election Archive

Victoria
Candidates for Victorian state elections